Saban English is the local dialect of English spoken on Saba, an island in the Dutch Caribbean. It belongs to the group of Caribbean English varieties, and has been classified as a decreolized form of Virgin Islands Creole English. There is one published dictionary of Saban English, A Lee Chip, authored by Theodore R. Johnson.

Phonology

Consonants 
The Saban dialect is not purely rhotic nor non-rhotic. Post-vocalic /r/ is absent in unstressed syllables or following front vowels, but pronounced in stressed syllables and following back vowels, with the exception of the words more and farm. Phrase initially, /r/ is pronounced as [ɹ].

H-dropping is common in Saban dialects. [θ] becomes [ʔ] intervocalically and phrase finally,  is pronounced like /maʔ/. T-glottalization is also common intervocally, phrase finally and in clusters: water, hospital, bet and ate are pronounced like [wɒʔa], [haspɪʔl], [bɛ:ʔ] and [ɛ:ʔ].

This also happens in the Vincentian, Bermudian, Bahamian English and other Caribbean Englishes. This results in the word seventh being pronounced as [sɛβənʔ].

Metathesis is a common feature of Saban English and results in words like "ask" sounding like [æks]. Nasal backing is common in Saban English: "Town" sounds like [taʊŋ] and "ground" sounds like [graʊŋ]. Consonant cluster are often reduced.

Vowels 
The realization of vowels in Saban English is as follows. The vowels below are named by the lexical set they belong to:
The Dress vowel: Saban English shows lowering of the Dress vowel and the vowel can be pronounced as either , .
It merges with the Fleece vowel before nasal consonants, so words like mean and main are homophonous.
The North vowel: It is merged with the vowel in Start and is usually .
The Force vowel: The North/Force split has been preserved on Saba, but it appears to be undergoing merger.
The Choice diphthong: The nucleus of the diphthong is lowered, and, sometimes fronted, being pronounced as either  or 

Grammar
Ain't ([ɛ̃ː], [ɛn] or [ɛnt]) is frequently used in negations and can be used in the place of words like didn’t or haven’t. Saban English also makes extensive use of the expression “for to” as in the sentence: This is ready for to come ripe.

References

Dialects of English
English
Culture of Saba (island)
Caribbean English